Concord Airport may refer to:

 Buchanan Field Airport in Concord, California, United States (FAA/IATA: CCR)
 Concord Municipal Airport in Concord, New Hampshire, United States (FAA/IATA: CON)
 Concord Regional Airport in Concord, North Carolina, United States (FAA: JQF, IATA:USA)

See also
 Concord (disambiguation)